King Dest, (born "Hamza Herrero" March 15, 1984) formerly  known as  "MalputoDest,"  is a Barcelonian rapper and songwriter.

Early life
Born in Barcelona and raised in Costa del Maresme, King Dest, was attracted to football and hip hop music since childhood.  At the age of fourteen, he staged his first concert as a member of the music group known as "Alia-2" which won a local model competition at the time.

Music career
In 2007 King Dest settled in the center of Barcelona and set up his own studio known as "Dry Sound." In 2008, he was arrested for drug trafficking  and illicit possession of weapons. After his release, he decided to concentrate fully on his career as a rapper. In 2009 he made his first appearance on the album of "Primer dan - 1st Dan (LP)". In that same year, he published his first reference tagged Illegal Mixtape.

In 2010 King Dest collaborated with Masta Flow on the theme Casablanca. In 2012 Lírico invited him to collaborate in his album titled Un antes y un después. In 2014 he made official his first album titled Educación de asfalto where artists such as Mucho Muchacho, N-Wise, Lirico and Don Bigg collaborated among others. In March 2015 he was invited to collaborate in the first Spanish TeamBackpack.

Discography
The table below chronicles King Dest's discography:

References

1984 births
Musicians from Barcelona
Living people